The Alliance of Black Jews was an American organization that was started in Chicago, Illinois, in 1995 by a group of African Americans who self-identified as Jews and Black Hebrews. At the time, they claimed to have estimated that there were about 200,000 black Jews in the United States. The figure, which included Black Hebrew Israelites (not recognized as Jews by mainstream Judaism), as well as Reform, Conservative, Orthodox and Reconstructionist African-American Jews by birth or conversion, was based in part on the 1990 Jewish Population Study, which gave figures ranging from 135,000 to 260,000, depending on the definition of a Jew.

The individuals involved in forming the organization included Robin Washington, Michelle Stein-Evers, and Rabbi Capers C. Funnye Jr.

The organization is no longer operational.

See also
American Jews
Black Hebrew Israelites

References

Further reading

African-American history in Chicago
African American–Jewish relations
Jews and Judaism in Chicago
African-American Judaism
Black Hebrew Israelites
Jewish religious organizations
African-American organizations
Jewish organizations established in 1995
1995 establishments in Illinois
Defunct Jewish organizations